A list of Hanfu, the historical clothing of the Han Chinese, in category of different clothing style. This page also addresses provides a list of garments.

Informal wear 

Types include tops and bottoms, long skirt, and one-piece robes that wrap around the body once or several times (shenyi).

Zhongyi (中衣), which is usually the inner garment much like a Western T-shirt and pants, can be wear along in casual.

The typical set of informal wear consists of two or three layers. The first layer is mostly zhongyi (中衣). The next layer is the main layer which is mostly closed at the front. There can be an optional third layer which is often an overcoat called a zhaoshan which is open at the front.

For footwear, white socks and black cloth shoes (with white soles) are the norm. But in the past, shoes may have a front face panel attached to the tip of the shoes.

Semi-formal wear 
Generally, this form of wear is suitable for meeting guests or going to meetings and other special cultural days. This form of dress is often worn by the nobility or the upper-class as they are often expensive pieces of clothing, usually made of silks and damasks. The coat sleeves are often deeper than the shenyi to create a more voluminous appearance.

A piece of ancient Chinese clothing can be "made semi-formal" by the addition of the following appropriate items:

 Chang (裳): a pleated skirt
 Bixi (蔽膝): a cloth attached from the waist, covering front of legs.
 Zhaoshan (罩衫): long open fronted coat

Formal wear 
In addition to informal and semi-formal wear, there is a form of dress that is worn only at confucian rituals, important sacrifices, religious activities or by special people who are entitled to wear them (such as officials and emperors).

The most formal dress civilians can wear is the xuanduan (sometimes called yuanduan 元端), which consists of a black or dark blue top garment that runs to the knees with long sleeve (often with white piping), a bottom red chang, a red bixi (which can have a motif and/or be edged in black), an optional white belt with two white streamers hanging from the side or slightly to the front called peishou (佩綬), and a long black guan. Additionally, wearers may carry a long jade gui (圭) or wooden hu (笏) tablet (used when greeting royalty). This form of dress is mostly used in sacrificial ceremonies such as Ji Tian (祭天) and Ji Zu (祭祖), etc., but is also appropriate for state occasions. The xuanduan is basically a simplified version of full court dress of the officials and the nobility.

Court dress 

Court dress is the dress worn at very formal occasions and ceremonies that are in the presence of a monarch (such as an enthronement ceremony). The entire ensemble of clothing can consist of many complex layers and look very elaborate. Court dress is similar to the xuanduan in components but have additional adornments and elaborate headwear. They are often brightly colored with vermillion and blue. There are various versions of court dress that are worn for certain occasions. The practical use of court dress is now obsolete in the modern age since there is no reigning monarch in China anymore.

Those in academia or officialdom have distinctive gowns (known as changfu 常服 in court dress terms). This varies over the ages but they are typically round collared gowns closed at the front. The most distinct feature is the headgear which has 'wings' attached. Only those who passed the civil examinations are entitled to wear them, but a variation of it can be worn by ordinary scholars and laymen and even for a groom at a wedding (but with no hat).

Court dress of emperors

Court dress of officials

Court dress for women

Cloaks

Lower garments

Religious clothing

Those in the religious orders wear a plain middle layer garment followed by a highly decorated cloak or coat. Taoists have a 'scarlet gown' (絳袍) which is made of a large square-shaped cloak sewn at the hem to create very long deep sleeves used in very formal rituals. They are often scarlet or crimson in colour with wide edging and embroidered with intricate symbols and motifs such as the eight trigrams and the yin and yang Taiji symbol.

Buddhist have a cloak with gold lines on a scarlet background creating a brickwork pattern which is wrapped around over the left shoulder and secured at the right side of the body with cords. There may be further decorations, especially for high priests.

Daoists, Buddhists and Confucians may have white stripe chevrons.

Handwear

Gloves and mitts

See also 
Hanfu
List of Hanfu headwear
Hanfu footwear
Chinese academic dress
Mandarin square
Hanfu Accessories
Garment collars in Hanfu
Chinese auspicious ornaments in textile and clothing

References

Hanfu
Clothing-related lists